General Stig Gustaf Eugén Synnergren (25 February 1915 – 29 April 2004) was a Swedish Army officer who was the Supreme Commander of the Swedish Armed Forces from 1970 to 1978. Synnergren was a strong advocate for the conscription system and during his time as Supreme Commander the combat aircraft Saab 37 Viggen was introduced. Synnergren was famous for advancing from the rank of captain to becoming the "youngest general in the modern times" in just five years.

Early life
Synnergren was born on 25 February 1915 in Överluleå Parish, Boden Municipality, Sweden, the son of Gösta Synnergren, an engine driver, and his wife Sara (née Carlstén). His father was also a Social Democratic city councilman in Boden and his mother was a Social Democratic member of the child welfare committee. Synnergren's school years were marked by sports, physical education and outdoor recreation. He passed studentexamen in Luleå in 1936 with the grades A in physics and a in mathematics and chemistry. He was then admitted to the Royal Institute of Technology in Stockholm. He had at this time no thought of becoming an officer.

The turning point of his life happened during a fall day in 1936 during the Berlin Olympics in which Synnergren participated as a member of the Swedish gymnastics squad. The experience of Adolf Hitler, surrounded by the Third Reich throughout threatening paramilitary splendor changed Synnergren's choice of career. Like so many of his peers, he had a strong feeling that a new world war was imminent. He withdrew his application to the Royal Institute of Technology and decided to become an officer. In 1939, as World War II broke out, he finished first in his class at the Swedish Infantry Officer Candidate School at the Royal Military Academy.

Career

Military career
Synnergren was commissioned as an officer with the rank of second lieutenant in 1939 and served in the Ski Battalion (I 19 K) in Kiruna during World War II and guarded the Norwegian border when Germany occupied Narvik. After the German attack on Norway on 9 April 1940, he as an intelligence officer in the regimental staff, on several occasions, alone and on skis, got into the war zone in Northern Norway to make contact with the Norwegian forces and gather intelligence within the German dominated area. Because of his fell experience and skills, he became, after a brief interlude as a cadet officer at Karlberg in 1944, the head of evacuation in Jokkmokk and was as such responsible for management of the Norwegian refugees. After the war, he was appointed captain in 1946 and did in a short time a rapid military career.

Synnergren graduated from the Royal Swedish Army Staff College in 1948 and became a cadet of the General Staff and then captain of the General Staff. He conducted studies in the Norwegian Army in 1950 and 1953, the British Army in 1951 and 1953 and the United States Army in 1951 and 1959. He was a teacher at the Royal Swedish Army Staff College from 1953 to 1956 and again from 1957 to 1958. Synnergren was promoted to major in 1957 and was head of the Tactics Department at the Army Staff from 1958 to 1960. He studied at the Swedish National Defence College in 1960 and was promoted to lieutenant colonel in the Svea Life Guards (I 1) in 1961.

Between 1962-63 he was commanding officer of Västernorrland Regiment (I 21). In 1963 he was promoted to major general and appointed Chief of the Army Staff and of the General Staff Corps. Between 1966-67 he was the military commander of Bergslagen Military District (Milo B). In 1967 he was promoted to lieutenant general and appointed Chief of the Defence Staff and was three years later promoted to general and appointed Supreme Commander of the Swedish Armed Forces. During Synnergren's time as the Supreme Commander, a series of long-term decisions were made that meant big changes for the defense. The policy of neutrality was concluded and thus the idea of a strong defense of universal conscription. It was decided that the aircraft Viggen would be developed while reorganizing and cut-backs were made in the Army and Navy.

Synnergren was in the media most closely associated with military intelligence as the secret intelligence agency IB was exposed during his time as Supreme Commander.

Other work
Synnergren had during and after his military career a series of positions of trust. He was chief of His Majesty's Military Staff from 1978 to 1986, chairman of the Swedish Tourist Association from 1976 to 1987 and chairman of the Swedish Ski Association from 1973 to 1975. He was also chairman of Stora AB from 1980 to 1986, Bergvik och Ala AB from 1981 and board member of Saab-Scania from 1981 to 1990, LKAB from 1982 to 1986, Saab Combitech from 1982 to 1990 and the International Ski Federation from 1976 to 1988. Synnergren was also a board member of the East Economic Office (Öst Ekonomiska Byrån), an agency which occupied a special position among the agencies engaged in the Swedish military intelligence.

Personal life
In 1941, Synnergren married junior school teacher Margit Lindgren (1916–2016), the daughter of the first office clerk at SJ, Anton Lindgren and his wife Anna Richardsson. He was the father of Britta (born 1942), Kristina (born 1946) and Elisabeth (born 1947).

Death
Synnergren died on 28 April 2004 in Hedvig Eleonora Parish, Stockholm. He was interred at Galärvarvskyrkogården in Stockholm.

Dates of rank
13 April 1939 – Second lieutenant
4 April 1941 – Lieutenant
1 April 1947 – Captain
1 April 1957 – Major
1 October 1961 – Lieutenant colonel
1 August 1962 – Colonel
1 October 1963 – Major general
1 April 1967 – Lieutenant general
1 October 1970 – General

Awards and decorations
  H. M. The King's Medal, 12th size gold medal worn around the neck on a chain of gold (1978)
  Commander Grand Cross of the Order of the Sword (6 June 1970)
   Commander 1st Class of the Order of the Sword (11 November 1966)
  Knight of the Order of the Sword (before 1963)
  Swedish Ski Association's Sixtus Medal (1988)

Foreign
  Grand Cross of the Order of the Falcon (26 October 1981)
  Grand Cross of the Order of St. Olav (1 July 1973)

Honours
Member of the Royal Swedish Academy of War Sciences (1956)
Honorary member of the Royal Swedish Society of Naval Sciences (1970)
Member of the Royal Swedish Academy of Engineering Sciences (1977)

References

External links

Article at Svenskt biografiskt lexikon 

1915 births
2004 deaths
Swedish Army generals
People from Boden Municipality
Commanders Grand Cross of the Order of the Sword
Grand Crosses with Star and Sash of the Order of Merit of the Federal Republic of Germany
Members of the Royal Swedish Academy of War Sciences
Members of the Royal Swedish Society of Naval Sciences
Members of the Royal Swedish Academy of Engineering Sciences
20th-century Swedish military personnel
Burials at Galärvarvskyrkogården
Chiefs of the Defence Staff (Sweden)